Parmelina tiliacea is a species of lichen belonging to the family Parmeliaceae.

It has a cosmopolitan distribution.

References

Parmeliaceae
Lichen species
Lichens described in 1784
Taxa named by Georg Franz Hoffmann